Louis Vincent Albano (July 29, 1933 – October 14, 2009) was an Italian-American professional wrestler, manager and actor, who performed under the ring/stage name "Captain" Lou Albano. He was active as a professional wrestler from 1953 until 1969 before becoming a manager until 1995.

Over the course of his 42-year career, Albano guided 15 different tag teams and three singles competitors to championship gold. Albano was one of the "Triumvirate of Terror", a threesome of nefarious WWF managers which included The Grand Wizard of Wrestling and Freddie Blassie. The trio was a fixture in the company for a decade until The Grand Wizard's death in 1983.

A unique showman, with an elongated beard, rubber band, facial piercings, and loud outfits, Albano was the forefather of the 1980s Rock 'n' Wrestling Connection. Working first with NRBQ and later with Cyndi Lauper, Albano helped usher in wrestling's crossover success with a mainstream audience. Capitalizing on his success, he later ventured into Hollywood with various television, film, and music projects. He became well known to a younger generation of fans as the actor and voice of Mario in The Super Mario Bros. Super Show!

Early life
Albano's parents, Carmen Louis Albano and Eleanor Albano née Morrone, were of Italian heritage but both born in the United States. Eleanor was a classical concert pianist who had performed at Carnegie Hall and later became a registered nurse. Her brother, a physician, introduced her to Carmen in the 1930s, who was training to be an obstetrician. After marrying, they temporarily relocated to Italy while Carmen pursued his medical degree at the University of Bari. He later co-patented a forceps instrument to assist in breech birth deliveries. Louis Albano was born in Italy when his father had three months remaining at the university. He was baptized in the Vatican, and his parents shortly thereafter returned to the New York City area aboard the RMS Majestic. Lou was one of nine children, of whom five lived to adulthood. The family settled in the Mount Vernon area. Lou attended Archbishop Stepinac High School in White Plains, New York, where he competed in track and field, and finally rose to the position of captain of the football team. It was this rank that later inspired his wrestling moniker, "Captain" Lou Albano. His skills were such that he received 32 offers of full scholarship from universities around the country, and he chose the University of Tennessee on the strength of their football team. Here, Albano was teammates with the likes of Darris McCord, Doug Atkins, and his roommate, Sam Rutigliano. Albano had conflicts with the dean due to poor behavior and was expelled after attempting to cheat on a final exam. He then joined the United States Army, but due to a childhood injury exacerbated by his football days, Albano was honorably discharged after only eight months.

Professional wrestling career

Early career (1953–1967)
Although Albano's father, retired from medicine, wanted to open an insurance agency with his son, Lou instead began training as a boxer. A distant cousin and family friend, Lou Duva, introduced Albano to Willie Gilzenberg, a boxing promoter who later became the first titular president of the WWWF. Gilzenberg, noting Albano's relatively short stature, instead encouraged him to enter wrestling. Albano's father had himself been an amateur wrestler, and Albano himself had been introduced to professional wrestling at an event held at Fort Dix during his tenure in the Army, where he had seen the likes of Gorgeous George, Arnold Skaaland, Soldier Barry, and Lenny Montana—all of whom Albano later worked with. Gilzenberg asked Soldier Barry to help train Albano, and in 1952, the two began doing house shows in the New York area. Albano was originally seen as a "pretty boy," and wrestled as the babyface "Leaping Lou Albano". After a non-wrestling injury caused a gash on his forehead, he purposefully did not allow the scar to heal, and the minor disfigurement allowed him to turn heel. Now billed as the "Mount Vernon Mauler," and occasionally a pirate, he began establishing himself in the New York professional wrestling community. At this point, Gilzenberg introduced Albano to Vince McMahon Sr., promoter of the new Capitol Wrestling Corporation in Washington, D.C.—the first predecessor to what is today WWE. Albano worked for Capitol Wrestling and its successors, under Vince McMahon and his son, for most of the rest of his career. Albano made little impact as a solo wrestler, working prelims in various circuits, but he achieved moderate success as a tag team performer with partner Tony Altomare. Dubbed The Sicilians, Altomare and Albano competed as a stereotypical Italian gangster combo in the mode of the then-popular television series The Untouchables. The pair won the Midwest tag team championship on the undercard of June 30, 1961 Comiskey Park event starring Pat O'Connor and Buddy Rogers that set the all-time record gate in the United States to that point. Their realistic depiction of gangster characters caught the attention of actual mafiosi in 1961. In Chicago, Tony Accardo and two associates "requested" that Albano and Altomare cease using the word "mafia". During their run as Midwest tag team champions, personal differences with bookers and other wrestlers resulted in the pair abandoning the territory quickly enough that they did not lose the title before leaving.

WWWF/WWF (1964, 1967–1986)
In 1964, Albano wrestled for the World Wide Wrestling Federation as a singles competitor.

The Sicilians and breakup (1967–1969)
Albano returned in 1967 and again partnered with Tony Altomare as "The Sicilians". In July, they won the WWWF United States Tag Team Championship from Arnold Skaaland and Spiros Arion.  Albano and Altomare only held the championship for two weeks, a title change which was not even acknowledged on WWWF television outside the Atlantic City market. But several photographs of the pair with their title belts were taken, which elevated Albano's reputation in the wrestling magazines of the time, and provided good publicity fodder later in his career. By 1969 The Sicilians disbanded and went their separate ways. Albano went as a singles competitor.

Becoming a manager (1970)
In 1970, fellow wrestler Bruno Sammartino mentioned to McMahon that Albano, a mediocre wrestler who was nonetheless an entertaining speaker, might be better utilized as a manager. In professional wrestling, a manager might be tasked with behind-the-scenes efforts to help push forward a charge's career or handle his booking, but plays an equal or even greater role in the ring, speaking for his charge and helping rile up the crowd for or against him. Sammartino recalled: "One day I said to Vince Sr., this guy [Albano] isn't the best wrestler, as a team, they [Albano & Altomare] can only go so far. But he'd be a great mouthpiece for some guy. Lou has such a gift of gab that he can help out some people. As a wrestler, he just seemed limited. He was always the same. He was never looked upon by promoters as someone who could be anyone special. But as a manager, he shined. That was his calling." Albano, realizing that wrestlers had only a limited lifespan in the ring, and still dealing with his old football injury, agreed. Although it was his decision to split up his ten-year tag team partnership with Altomare, the two remained very close until the latter's death in 2003.

At this time, managers were relatively rare in the pro wrestling world—WWWF had only two others. However, a promising new wrestler, Oscar "Crusher" Verdu, had just recently emigrated from Spain. His in-ring capabilities were hampered by a limited command of English, and Albano was assigned to be his mouthpiece. Albano emphasized Verdu's physique and insisted that he had never been taken off his feet during a match. To rile up audiences, he also engaged in ethnic slurs, which were then a more common part of WWWF banter; Albano promised that Verdu would stomp on "that Italian" (Sammartino); the fact that Albano was known to be Italian himself only heightened the audience's reaction. Sammartino later said, "They wanted to see me beat the hell out of Verdu to make Albano a liar. He could get the kind of heat that nobody else could." The result was a Madison Square Garden sellout when Verdu faced Sammartino in June 1970, the first for the company in five years and a then-record gate for a wrestling event in that arena. The record lasted only a month, when a rematch brought in over $85,000 in ticket receipts.  After losing that match, Verdu cycled out of the WWWF rotation, but Albano remained as the top heel manager for the next 15 years.

Thus began his transition into the brash, bombastic manager "Captain" Lou Albano. With a quick wit and a grating personality, Albano delivered memorable promos and earned the scorn of the wrestling audience as he attempted to dethrone World Wide Wrestling Federation (WWWF) superstar and Heavyweight Champion Bruno Sammartino. Albano described the strategy behind his overblown, ranting interview style: "I just remember the point I wanna bring across, and then I just babble before, during, and after. Somehow, in the middle, I said the two or three sentences that sold tickets. Mostly, I just tried to make people want to see me get my ass kicked, and along the way, hopefully the guy I was managing would catch a beating too!" Growing out his hair and beard, and packing on extra pounds, Albano gave the image of a wild man. He developed a later trademark, applying rubber bands to his beard, after having seen a homeless man do the same. He also often wore a rubber band hanging from a safety pin pushed through his cheek.

Career as a manager (1971–1984)
In January 1971, Albano was the manager when Ivan Koloff ended Sammartino's seven-year reign as champion. Koloff's title reign was a transitional one, lasting just three weeks. Koloff had a typical heel run against Sammartino in 1969, but Albano spent months claiming that his previous manager had trained him incorrectly, and that Koloff would beat Sammartino under Albano's expert tutelage. The shock of Koloff's victory was such that the crowd fell totally silent, and Sammartino momentarily feared that he had lost his hearing. Koloff and Albano were quickly rushed out of the ring by security without the championship belt as the crowd began to riot. Albano, his wife, and a family friend, who were both in attendance, escaped to a taxi outside the Garden. The mob surrounded the cab and began breaking windows, so the trio ran to a nearby bar, followed by the crowd who were pelting them with mud and objects. The mob was beginning to destroy the bar as the police finally arrived. Vince McMahon received a bill for damages totaling $27,000 ($182,378 in 2021 dollars), cementing Albano's unparalleled ability to "draw heat" (arouse anger in the audience).

Another protege of Albano was "Iron Mike" McCord. In a memorable match in 1974 Chief Jay Strongbow applied his famous sleeper hold on McCord but Albano interfered in the match by smashing an arm cast over Strongbow's forehead, causing him to bleed badly.  McCord was disqualified due to outside interference. 
Later Strongbow settled the score by challenging Albano to put on the wrestling tights once again. And the stage was set in front of a sold-out crowd at Madison Square Garden, where he defeated Captain Lou Albano quite convincingly.

Albano then resumed his role as the mastermind trying to lead his latest bad guy protege to the gold. For the remainder of the 1970s and into the mid-1980s, Albano's cadre of loyal henchmen were unable to re-secure the heavyweight championship, held by either Sammartino, Pedro Morales, Bob Backlund or Hulk Hogan. However, Albano guided singles wrestlers Don Muraco and Greg Valentine to the Intercontinental Heavyweight Championship. Furthermore, Albano guided thirteen teams to the WWF World Tag Team Championships, including The Valiant Brothers, The Wild Samoans, The Yukon Lumberjacks, The Blackjacks, The Moondogs, The Masked Executioners, and after becoming a face (short for babyface, a wrestling term for a good guy/heroic character), the U.S. Express and the British Bulldogs. It was during his stewardship of the Valiant Brothers that Albano picked up his "Captain" nickname, as the act was promoted as "Captain Lou and the Valiants too." By the end of his career, Albano had managed over 50 different wrestlers who won two dozen championships.

Albano could also help elevate wrestlers by splitting from them. In 1982, despite being managed by the villainous Albano, Jimmy Snuka was unexpectedly becoming a fan favorite due to his high-flying ring style. An interview segment revealed that Snuka had no legal contract with Albano, and thus was able to leave his manager. Shortly thereafter, a bloody beatdown by Albano, Freddie Blassie and Ray Stevens, helped transform Snuka into a sympathetic figure, and triggered the most successful period of his career. Albano had previously helped turn the villainous Intercontinental Champion Pat Patterson into a fan favorite, by "purchasing" Patterson's contract against his will. He also managed the U.S. Express at WrestleMania.

Final storylines (1979–1986)
In 1979, Jimmy Valiant introduced Albano to NRBQ on the latter's tour bus.  Bandmember Terry Adams invited Albano to play the part of their manager and he agreed. In 1980, Albano taped a TV commercial for the band's album Tiddlywinks.  At the time, it was considered "offensive" so it was broadcast only once in the Boston area.  Audience members were taken aback when Albano was formally introduced into the music business by NRBQ at The Ritz in January 1981. In 1984, Albano met pop singer Cyndi Lauper on a plane flight from Puerto Rico. Her manager, David Wolff, suggested that the two collaborate on a project at some point in the future. In 1984, the opportunity came when Lauper's video for "Girls Just Want to Have Fun" needed an actor to play the singer's father, and Albano was suggested. Initially reluctant, he was convinced by his wife to agree, and Lauper and Albano thereafter formed a lifelong friendship. He appeared in several of her music videos and she appeared on Roddy Piper's "Piper's Pit" program to discuss the collaboration. Albano, in character, began denigrating Lauper and women in general and claimed to have written all her songs and been the only reason for her success. Lauper, in turn, assaulted Albano with her purse, and the two agreed to settle their differences in the ring. Albano and Lauper agreed to compete by proxy, each choosing a female wrestler to contend. Lauper chose Wendi Richter, while Albano chose The Fabulous Moolah. The match, scheduled for July 23, 1984, was dubbed The Brawl to End it All, and was broadcast live on MTV. During the match, Lauper interfered on Richter's behalf by hitting Moolah in the head with her purse, dubbed "The Loaded Purse of Doom". At the conclusion of the match, Richter had defeated Moolah for the WWF Women's Championship, which the WWF had promoted Moolah as having held for the previous 28 years. NRBQ compiled all the recordings they'd done with Albano on their album, "Lou and the Q" which includes their 1981 single "Captain Lou" b/w "Boardin' House Pie"— on which Albano himself sings and rants.

In the meantime, Albano had become involved in several charities. His brother's brother-in-law had recently died of multiple sclerosis, and the experience led Albano to lend his time to raising awareness and funds to combat the disease, occasionally alongside Lauper. His increasingly public benevolence clashed with his in-ring persona, which violated the principles of kayfabe—maintaining the appearance of reality within professional wrestling—which were still strictly adhered to at the time. In 1984, Albano decided it was time, after 32 years as a heel, to turn face. He therefore arranged for Lauper to receive an in-ring award for her contributions to both wrestling and the fight against MS, for which he also came out and congratulated her. In the course of the ceremony, Roddy Piper and "Cowboy" Bob Orton came into the ring to sarcastically praise Albano before breaking Lauper's award, a gold record plaque, over his head. Lauper and her boyfriend-manager David Wolff were also attacked by Piper and Orton. The melee was broken up by Hulk Hogan, but the altercation allowed Albano to now wrestle and manage as a crowd favorite. His last two (heel) singles protégés, Valentine and Ken Patera, were paired with Jimmy Hart and Bobby Heenan, respectively, after Albano's face turn. Although he continued his overblown, rambling interviews—one of the lead announcers for the WWF, Gorilla Monsoon, continued to refer to Albano as "The Fountain of Misinformation"—Albano was now leading fan favorites such as The U.S. Express, George Steele, The British Bulldogs, Hulk Hogan and André the Giant into battle. The U.S. Express and British Bulldogs became the first tag teams to win the WWF Tag Team Championships with Albano as a "face" manager.

Superstars of Wrestling and UWF (1986–1991)
Albano left the WWF in late 1986 with one final match on an episode of Wrestling Challenge that aired on November 16, 1986, teaming with The British Bulldogs to defeat The Dream Team and Luscious Johnny Vailant. Albano would then make a one-time appearance on a "Piper's Pit" on an episode of Superstars of Wrestling in February 1987 to ask André the Giant to reconsider his recent alignment with Bobby Heenan. Albano briefly worked in Herb Abrams' UWF promotion in 1991, where he hosted an interview segment.

Return to WWF and retirement (1994–1995)
Albano returned to the WWF in 1994 to manage the newly face-turned Headshrinkers, helping lead them to the WWF Tag Team Championship. He left in early 1995, making sporadic appearances as a guest from then on, but never again as a manager.

Legacy in the WWE
The events leading up to Albano's face turn proved to be pivotal in the history of the WWF. Hogan, Piper, and Orton began a feud at Lauper's award ceremony that culminated in The War to Settle the Score. The outcome of the War—Hogan winning by disqualification—was the impetus for the primary match at the first WrestleMania, in which Albano also participated, as a face manager. More importantly, the involvement of Lauper, a celebrity completely unrelated to wrestling, in the pro wrestling world was unprecedented. MTV's decision to broadcast the Brawl to End it All tremendously increased the WWF's public profile, especially in the coveted young adult demographic. This led directly to the 1980s professional wrestling boom. Wrestling Observers Dave Meltzer wrote, "Without Albano, wrestling history would have been monumentally different because if you take Lauper's involvement out of the equation, the early losses on expanding nationally and buying so much television time were on the verge of putting the company under... Without her, there would have been no MTV special, no national media publicity, and it's highly unlikely without it that the first WrestleMania would have been a success. If you take Albano's participation out of the equation, there is a good chance the McMahon expansion would have hit an iceberg and died in early 1985 ... the attention garnered by the Rock & Wrestling Connection, stemming from that chance meeting on an airplane between Lauper and Albano less than two years earlier, led NBC to make the decision to air Saturday Night's Main Event several times per year in the Saturday Night Live time slot."

Television and film
Albano appeared in the 1986 film Wise Guys, starring Danny DeVito. He played the role of Mario, Nintendo's mascot, in both the live-action and animated segments of The Super Mario Bros. Super Show!, a TV series based on the Super Mario Bros. game series. He also had roles in the TV series 227, Hey Dude,  and Miami Vice, the 1992 film Stay Tuned, and was a recurring guest on the game show Hollywood Squares. Albano played a villainous caricature of himself named "Captain Lou Morano" in the 1987 movie Body Slam, starring Dirk Benedict and Roddy Piper. The film also included cameo appearances by wrestlers Ric Flair, Freddie Blassie, and Bruno Sammartino. Albano played the role of the father in Cyndi Lauper's music videos for "Girls Just Want to Have Fun", "The Goonies 'R' Good Enough"  and "She Bop", as well as a cook in the video for her song "Time After Time".

Personal life
In 1953, Albano married his high school sweetheart, Geraldine Tango. The marriage lasted 56 years, until his death. Albano has been noted by several others for his faithfulness to his wife, a rare characteristic in the on-the-road world of 1970s and 1980s professional wrestling. Albano released his autobiography, Often Imitated, Never Duplicated, on July 20, 2008, through his website. The book includes a foreword by Cyndi Lauper. The other Albano siblings are Vincent, George, Eleanor, and Carl, all of whom became teachers. Albano's brother, Carl, taught health for 32 years at Ridgewood High School in Ridgewood, New Jersey, and was head of the Ridgewood High health department from 1974 until 2001. Carl's students have noted that he used his brother Lou as an example of the difference between crazy and unique. George served as the principal of Lincoln Elementary School in Mount Vernon, New York and often brought Lou in to delight the school's students during their lunch hour. Vincent was an art teacher and lived part-time in a lake house in Connecticut. Eleanor was a music teacher for preschool students in Connecticut.

Albano's son, Carl Albano, has been a member of the Putnam County Legislature since 2011. During the 1990s, Albano shed 150 pounds (68.0389 kg) following a health scare. In May 2005, Albano suffered a heart attack, but later recovered. Albano was sent home from the hospital and again began watching his health. The song "Captain Lou" by Kimya Dawson is dedicated to him (not to be confused with the 1981 NRBQ song of the same name).

Death
Albano died on October 14, 2009, in Westchester County, New York, of a heart attack while residing in hospice care. He was 76 years old.

Filmography

Film

Television

Video games

Music videos

Championships and accomplishments
Cauliflower Alley Club
Other honoree (1995)
Fred Kohler Enterprises
Midwest Tag Team Championship (1 time) – with Tony Altomare
New England Wrestling Alliance
NEWA Hall of Fame (Class of 2011)
Pro Wrestling Illustrated
Manager of the Year (1974, 1981, 1986)
Editors' Award (1994)
Professional Wrestling Hall of Fame and Museum
Class of 2009
World Wide Wrestling Federation/World Wrestling Federation
WWWF United States Tag Team Championship (1 time) – with Tony Altomare
WWF Hall of Fame (Class of 1996)
Wrestling Observer Newsletter
Best on Interviews (1981) tied with Roddy Piper
Worst Worked Match of the Year (1985) vs. Freddie Blassie at Nassau Veterans Memorial Coliseum
Wrestling Observer Newsletter Hall of Fame (Class of 2012)

Notes

References

"WWE Hall of Fame Profile"
"Wrestling Museum Hall of Fame Induction Article"

External links

Lou Albano on Posterous

Professional Wrestling Hall of Fame profile

1933 births
2009 deaths
20th-century Italian male actors
21st-century Italian male actors
American color commentators
American male professional wrestlers
American professional wrestlers of Italian descent
American male voice actors
Italian Roman Catholics
American Roman Catholics
Archbishop Stepinac High School alumni
Burials in New York (state)
Italian emigrants to the United States
Italian male professional wrestlers
People from Putnam County, New York
People of Lazian descent
Professional Wrestling Hall of Fame and Museum
Professional wrestling managers and valets
Sportspeople from Mount Vernon, New York
United States Army soldiers
WWE Hall of Fame inductees